Operation Manhattan was an operation conducted by the 1st and 2nd Brigades, 25th Infantry Division and the 3rd Brigade, 4th Infantry Division in the Ho Bo Woods/Bến Củi area, lasting from 23 April to 7 June 1967.

Background
The objective of the operation was to destroy Vietcong (VC) bases in the Ho Bo Woods, Boi Loi Woods, Bến Củi area and along the Saigon River.

Operation
The operation commenced on 23 April. On 9 May 2nd Brigade, 25th Infantry Division withdrew from the operation and returned to Củ Chi Base Camp to prepare for Operation Kolekole. On 10 May 3rd Brigade, 4th Infantry Division withdrew from the operation and returned to Dầu Tiếng Base Camp to prepare for Operations Ahina and Operation Diamond Head. The 1st Brigade, 25th Infantry Division continued the operation, providing security for the 65th Engineer Battalion which used Rome plows to destroy VC fortifications when discovered.

Aftermath
Operation Manhattan officially concluded on 7 June, VC losses were 74 killed, with a further 99 estimated killed, 19 captured and three Chieu hoi. A total of 201 small arms and 18 crew-served weapons were captured.

References

1967 in Vietnam
Battles involving the United States
Battles involving Vietnam
Battles and operations of the Vietnam War in 1967
Battles and operations of the Vietnam War
History of Bình Dương province
History of Tây Ninh Province